The Comité d'Information et de Liaison pour l'Archéologie, l'Étude et la Mise en Valeur du Patrimoine Industriel (CILAC) is a French non-profit organisation. Its aims are to assist the work of associations, learned societies and museums interested in the conservation and protection of the world's industrial heritage and to act as a lobby group in respect of issues which are important to its members.

The CILAC edits the journal L'Archéologie industrielle and an electronic newsletter.

External links
 Official Website

Industrial archaeology
Archaeological organizations